Austrolebias charrua is a species of killifish from the family Rivulidae.  It is endemic to the basin of the Laguna dos Patos in southern Brazil. This species was described in 2001 with the type locality given as a temporary pool near Chuí and Santa Vitória do Palmar in Rio Grande do Sul. The specific name refers to the Charrúa an indigenous people who lived in Rio Grande do Sul, as well as neighbouring parts of Argentina and Uruguay.

References

charrua
Fish described in 2001